The D.I.C.E. Award for Outstanding Achievement in Art Direction is an award presented annually by the Academy of Interactive Arts & Sciences during the academy's annual D.I.C.E. Awards. This award is "presented to the individual or team whose work represents the highest level of achievement in designing a unified graphic look for an interactive title." It originally was presented as Outstanding Achievement in Art/Graphics, with its first winner being Riven: The Sequel to Myst. It was renamed to the Outstanding Achievement Award in Art Direction at the 3rd Annual Interactive Achievement Awards.

The award's most recent winner is God of War Ragnarök, developed by Santa Monica Studio and published by Sony Interactive Entertainment.

Winners and nominees

1990s

2000s

2010s

2020s

Multiple nominations and wins

Developers and publishers 
Sony has published the most nominees and winners. Having multiple back-to-back wins, but with different developers. Nintendo and Microsoft have also published multiple nominees and both have two winners. The only other publisher with back-to-back wins has been Square Electronic Arts. Ubisoft has published the most nominees without having a single winner. Nintendo, Microsoft, Ubisoft, and Square Enix Europe have also had multiple nominees for the same year. Several of Sony's developing subsidiaries have developed multiple nominees and winners. Insomniac Games has developed the most nominees, but only one has won so far. Sony subsidiaries Naughty Dog and Santa Monica Studio are tied for having developed the most winners. Sucker Punch Productions and Sony's Japan Studio have also won twice. The only developer with back-to-back wins has been SquareSoft. Ubisoft Montreal has developed nominees without having a single winner.

Franchises 
The most nominated franchises have been Call of Duty and Final Fantasy. Final Fantasy, God of War, and Uncharted have been the only franchises so far to have won more than once. God of War has been the most award-winning franchise.

Notes

References 

D.I.C.E. Awards
Awards established in 1998